The 1903–04 international cricket season was from September 1903 to April 1904. The season consists with a single international tour.

Season overview

December

England in Australia

References

International cricket competitions by season
1903 in cricket
1904 in cricket